"Resister" (stylized as RESISTER) is a song by Japanese pop singer ASCA. It was released digitally on January 13, 2019 before received a physical release on February 27, 2019. It reached number 14 on Oricon and number 21 on Japan Hot 100. It was used as the second opening theme of anime Sword Art Online: Alicization.

Release and reception
On 9 December 2018, the official website of the anime Sword Art Online: Alicization revealed about the second opening theme song "Resister" that would be sung by ASCA. The song was released digitally on January 13, 2019 before received a physical release on February 27, 2019 on three edition; Regular edition, Limited edition and Limited anime edition. The single reached number 14 on Oricon, 27 on Japan Hot 100, and 8 on Japan Hot Animation with spent 9, 10 and 11 weeks respectively. In July 2019, "Resister" was certified gold by the Recording Industry Association of Japan (RIAJ) for 100,000 full-track ringtone digital music downloads (Chaku Uta Full). The song was featured in her first album .

Music video
The music video for "Resister" was directed by Atsunori Toshi. The video features ASCA with the dancer singing and dancing in the factory. Some scene show the dancer shoot with a bow. And some scene show ASCA and the dancer singing and dancing with a lightning effect. The video end when ASCA is taking a bow.

Track listing

Regular edition

Limited edition

Limited anime edition

Personnel
Singer and bands
ASCA – vocals, lyrics (RESISTER, Tadaima.)
Ryosuke Shigenaga  – music, arranged, lyrics (RESISTER)
Saku, Kou Segawa - lyrics (Michishirube, Mirage)
Sho Horizaki - Bass
FIRE - Guitar
Yuya Ishii        - Drums
Tomoe Nakajima, Kiwako Tokunaga, Nao Yamada   - Violin & Viola
Kana Matsuo - Cello

Production
Satoshi Morishige – record
Eiichi Nishizawa – record, mixer

Charts

Certifications

Release history

References

ASCA songs
2019 singles
Anime songs
2019 songs